

References 

Native American history
Native American relations